Forrest Scott Kline (born November 7, 1983, in Ashland, Oregon) is an American musician, singer, songwriter,  and guitarist. He is the lead vocalist of the power pop band Hellogoodbye.

Early life
He is of German descent and spent most of his childhood in Huntington Beach, California and in Palm Desert, California, and attended Huntington Beach High School, along with ex-bandmate Jesse Kurvink, during his teenage years.

Music career
As part of Hellogoodbye, he won the MTV2 Dew Circuit Breakout contest.

Kline produced and recorded Never Shout Never's The Summer EP.

In 2010, he wrote or co-wrote the songs as well as produced Hellogoodbye's second LP Would It Kill You?.

Personal life
On June 25, 2010, Kline married his girlfriend of six years, Chelsea, with whom he lives in Long Beach, California.

A former vegan, Kline is pescatarian and supports the animal rights group People for the Ethical Treatment of Animals (PETA).

References 

 
 
 

1983 births
American male singer-songwriters
American people of German descent
American rock guitarists
American male guitarists
American rock singers
American rock songwriters
Living people
Singer-songwriters from California
Musicians from Ashland, Oregon
People from Huntington Beach, California
Writers from Ashland, Oregon
Singer-songwriters from Oregon
Guitarists from California
Guitarists from Oregon
21st-century American singers
21st-century American guitarists
21st-century American male singers